Hiranyakashipu, also known as Hiranyakashyap, is an asura king of the daityas in the Puranic scriptures of Hinduism.  

In Hindu mythology, Hiranyakashipu's younger brother, Hiranyaksha, is slain by the Varaha avatar of Vishnu. Angered by this, Hiranyakashipu decided to gain a boon of invulnerability by performing a penance to propitiate Brahma. After his subjugation of the three worlds, he is slain by the Narasimha avatar of Vishnu.

Etymology 
Hiranyakashipu literally translates to "clothed in gold" (hiranya "gold" kashipu "soft cushion"), and is often interpreted as depicting one who is fond of wealth and sensual comforts. In the Puranas, however, it is also stated the name was derived from a golden throne called 'Hiranyakashipu' the asura sat in or nearby during the atiratra (soma) sacrifice.

Legend

Birth 

According to a story from Bhagavata Purana, Hiranyakashipu and Hiranyaksha are Vishnu's gatekeepers Jaya and Vijaya, born on earth as the result of a curse from the Four Kumaras. In the Satya Yuga, Hiranyakashipu and Hiranyaksha - together called the Hiranyas - were born to Diti (a daughter of Daksha ) and the sage Kashyapa. It is said that asuras were born to them as a result of their union at the time of dusk, which was said to be an inauspicious time for such a deed.

Penance 

After Hiranyakashipu's younger brother Hiranyaksha's death at the hands of the Varaha avatar of Vishnu, Hiranyakashipu comes to hate Vishnu. He decides to kill him by gaining a boon of invulnerability from Brahma.

This initially seemed to work as planned, with Brahma becoming pleased by Hiranyakashipu's austerities. Brahma appears before Hiranyakashipu and offers him a boon of his choice. But when Hiranyakashipu asks for immortality, Brahma refuses. Hiranyakashipu then makes the following request: 
O my lord, O best of the givers of benediction, if you will kindly grant me the benediction I desire, please let me not meet death from any of the living entities created by you.

Grant me that I not die within any residence or outside any residence, during the daytime or at night, nor on the ground or in the sky. Grant me that my death not be brought by any being created by you, nor by any weapon, nor by any human being or animal.

Grant me that I not meet the death from any entity, living or nonliving. Grant me, further, that I not be killed by any demigod or demon or by any great snake from the lower planets. Since no one can kill you in the battlefield, you have no competitor. Therefore, grant me the benediction that I too may have no rival. Give me sole lordship over all the living entities and presiding deities, and give me all the glories obtained by that position. Furthermore, give me all the mystic powers attained by long austerities and the practice of yoga, for these cannot be lost at any time.

In other Puranas, many variations of the boon are given. The Shiva Purana mentions that Hiranyakashipu asked Brahma that he would be invulnerable to dry or wet weapons, thunderbolts, mountains, trees, missiles or any form of weapon. The Vayu Purana mentions that Hiranyakashipu asked to be so powerful, only Vishnu would slay him. Other variations include not being slain by any living being, not at daytime or nighttime and not above or below.

In section 14, the Anushasana Parva of the Mahabharata, the sage Upamanyu briefly mentioned to Krishna that Hiranyakashipu also performed another penance to please Shiva. Shiva granted Hiranyakashipu the boon that he would have unrivalled combat prowess, exceeding skill in the use of bow and other weapons as well as the powers of all the gods, including Indra, Yama, Kubera, Surya, Agni, Vayu, Soma, and Varuna.

In consequence of these two boons, Hiranyakashipu become so mighty that he was able to shake the very Himalayas down to their roots. Ravana once tried to lift Hiranyakashipu's earrings but he was unable to do so because they were very heavy.

According to the Skanda Purana, Hiranyakashipu ruled the universe for 107.28 million years.

Death 

While Hiranyakashipu was performing the penance to be granted this boon, Indra and the other devas attacked his home, seizing the opportunity in his absence. At this point, the divine sage Narada intervened to protect Hiranyakashipu's wife Kayadhu, whom he described as 'sinless'. Narada took Kayadhu into his care, and while she was under his guidance, her unborn child (Hiranyakashipu's son) Prahlada became influenced by the transcendental instructions of the sage, even in the womb. Later, growing as a child, Prahlada began to reap the harvest of Narada's prenatal training and gradually became recognised as a devout follower of Vishnu, much to his father's anguish.

Hiranyakashipu eventually became so angry and upset at his son's devotion to Vishnu (whom he saw as his mortal enemy) that he decided that he must kill him, but each time he attempted to kill the boy, Prahlada was protected by Vishnu's mystical power. When asked, Prahlada refuses to acknowledge his father as the supreme lord of the universe, and claimed that Vishnu was all-pervading and omnipresent. To which Hiranyakashipu points to a nearby pillar and asks if 'his Vishnu' is in it:

 "O most unfortunate Prahlada, you have always described a supreme being other than me, a supreme being who is above everything, who is the controller of everyone, and who is all-pervading. But where is He? If He is everywhere, then why is He not present before me in this pillar?"

Prahlada then answered,  "He is in the pillar, just as he is in the slightest dust." Hiranyakashipu, unable to control his anger, smashed the pillar with his mace. A tumultuous sound was heard, and Vishnu in the form of Narasimha appeared from the broken pillar and moved to attack Hiranyakashipu in defence of Prahlada.

Narasimha had appeared in the perfect of circumstances that would allow him to slay the wicked king. Hiranyakashipu could not be killed by human, deva or animal, but Narasimha was none of these, as he was an incarnate that was part human, and part animal. He attacked Hiranyakashipu at twilight (when it is neither day nor night) on the threshold of a courtyard (neither indoors nor outdoors), and placed the asura on his thighs (neither earth nor in the air). Using his claws (neither living nor non-living thing), he disembowelled and killed the asura.

Even after Hiranyakashipu's death, none of the gods and the demigods present were able to placate Narasimha's fury. So, all the gods and goddesses called his consort, the goddess Lakshmi, but she was also unable to do so. Then, at the request of Brahma, Prahlada was presented before Narasimha, who was finally calmed by the prayers of his devotee.

Holi

One of Hiranyakashipu's attempts to kill his son Prahlada was to have him sit on a burning pyre with his aunt Holika. Holika had a special boon that prevented her from being harmed by fire. Prahlada chanted Vishnu's name and in the battle of good against evil, Holika was burnt down but nothing happened to Prahlada. The survival of Prahlada is celebrated in Hinduism as the festival of Holi.

See also

Bhagavata Purana
Vishnu Purana

Footnotes

Daityas
Holi
Characters in the Bhagavata Purana
Asura